Angkor or Ankor may refer to:

Angkor, the site of a series of capital cities of the Khmer empire
Angkor Wat
Angkor Airways
Ankor, Somalia
Angkor: Heart of an Asian Empire, a 1989 illustrated book by Bruno Dagens